Carlos Andrés Muñoz Jaramillo (born August 3, 1992) is an amateur Colombian Greco-Roman wrestler, who won a bronze medal at the 2015 Pan American Games in Toronto.

He won the gold medal in his event at the 2022 Bolivarian Games held in Valledupar, Colombia.

References

External links
 

1992 births
Living people
Colombian male sport wrestlers
Olympic wrestlers of Colombia
Wrestlers at the 2015 Pan American Games
Pan American Games bronze medalists for Colombia
Place of birth missing (living people)
Wrestlers at the 2016 Summer Olympics
Pan American Games medalists in wrestling
South American Games gold medalists for Colombia
South American Games medalists in wrestling
Competitors at the 2018 South American Games
Medalists at the 2015 Pan American Games
Pan American Wrestling Championships medalists
21st-century Colombian people